Steven Alfred Hill  is an American reality television personality, model, guest speaker, author, and occasional actor. Hill is best known as a cast member on the twelfth season of the MTV reality television show The Real World.

Early life
Steven Hill was born in San Marcos, Texas, but was raised predominantly in Austin. At the age of 16, Hill left home and has since lived on his own. Before appearing on The Real World, Hill worked as a shirtless bartender at a gay bar, although he is straight. He also eventually worked Wal-Mart Distribution Center.

Career
Hill appeared on the 12th season of the Real World reality series, The Real World: Las Vegas. After The Real World ended, Hill appeared in several subsequent MTV shows, including one season of the Real World/Road Rules Challenge and was a co-host of Say What? Karaoke for a season. He also took part in a reunion mini-season with his Real World: Las Vegas castmates called Reunited: The Real World Las Vegas.

Personal life
In 2007, Hill was married to designer Donna Katz. They have one son Riley James David, born in April 2008. Hill and Katz divorced in 2010.

Filmography

References

External links
 
 MTV.com bio

American male film actors
American male television actors
Male models from Texas
Male actors from Austin, Texas
People from San Marcos, Texas
American male erotic dancers
Writers from Austin, Texas
The Real World (TV series) cast members
Living people

The Challenge (TV series) contestants
Year of birth missing (living people)